Saeed Aghajani is an Iranian footballer currently playing for Saba Qom in the Iranian Premier League

Club career
Aghajani joined the Saba Qom reserves in 2007. Since then, he spent his entire career with the team.

References

External links 
Persian League Profile

Living people
Iranian footballers
Saba players
Association football defenders
Year of birth missing (living people)